is a hot spring resort in the city of  Kaga, Ishikawa Prefecture, Japan. As its name implies, it is in a mountainous region. The Daishoji River runs through the resort. It is a popular tourist spot for Japanese and foreign travelers.

This hot spring has one hotel and 20 ryokan.

History
Yamanaka Onsen has a very ancient history, and there are several myths about its foundation. One story attributes it to the wandering Buddhist monk Gyōki in the Nara period. Another story states that the Kamakura period samurai Hasebe Nobutsura discovered the springs while following an injured white heron and seeing it bath in the hot waters.

It was patronised in the Muromachi period by the Ikkō-ikki leader Rennyo and was visited in the Edo period by the poet Matsuo Bashō.

During World War II, it was designated as a military hospital area for the Imperial Japanese Navy.

See also 
 Yamanaka, Ishikawa
 Great sugi of Kayano

Gallery

External links

 
JNTO site
Yamanaka Onsen Tourism Association

Hot springs of Ishikawa Prefecture
Tourist attractions in Ishikawa Prefecture
Spa towns in Japan
Kaga, Ishikawa